Leandro Leivas (born 6 July 1988) is a Uruguayan rugby union player who plays for the Seattle Seawolves in Major League Rugby (MLR). He was named in Uruguay's squad for the 2015 Rugby World Cup.

Leivas learned to play rugby at Stella Maris College. At the time of the 2015 Rugby World Cup he was working as a blacksmith and farrier.

On 11 December 2018, he signed with professional Canadian club Toronto Arrows for the 2019 Major League Rugby season.

Honours
Uruguay U20
World Rugby Under 20 Trophy: 2008

References

External links

1988 births
Living people
Expatriate rugby union players in Canada
Place of birth missing (living people)
Uruguay international rugby union players
Uruguayan expatriate rugby union players
Uruguayan expatriate sportspeople in Canada
Toronto Arrows players
Uruguayan rugby union players
Rugby union wings
People educated at Stella Maris College (Montevideo)